Bonvicino is a comune (municipality) in the Province of Cuneo in the Italian region Piedmont, located about  southeast of Turin and about  northeast of Cuneo.

Bonvicino borders the following municipalities: Belvedere Langhe, Bossolasco, Dogliani, Murazzano and Somano.

Demographic evolution

References 

Cities and towns in Piedmont